The 2009–10 Stony Brook Seawolves men's basketball team was a college basketball team which represented Stony Brook University in the 2009–10 college basketball season. This was head coach Steve Pikiell's fifth season at Stony Brook. The Seawolves competed in the America East Conference and played their home games at Pritchard Gymnasium. They finished the season 22–10, 13–3 in America East play to win the regular season championship. They lost in the semifinals of the 2010 America East men's basketball tournament but received an automatic bid to the 2010 National Invitation Tournament as the regular season champions. The NIT berth was Stony Brook's first ever postseason bid as a Division I school. They hosted Illinois in the first round and lost 76–66.

Roster
Source

Schedule and results
Source
All times are Eastern

|-
!colspan=9 style=| Regular Season

|-
!colspan=10 style=| America East tournament

|-
!colspan=9 style=| NIT

References

Stony Brook Seawolves men's basketball seasons
Stony Brook
Stony Brook
Stony Brook
Stony Brook